"I Believe"  is a 1994 song by American vocal and instrumental ensemble Sounds of Blackness. It was produced by Jimmy Jam & Terry Lewis and was written by the duo along with: Marvin R. Pierce, Ralph Middlebrooks, Eugene Marshall Jones, Clarence Satchell, Gregory Allen Webster and Walter Junie Morrison. The song was released as the first single from the group's third album, Africa to America; The Journey of the Drum. It was the group's sixth release to make the US Billboard soul chart, peaking at #15, and their only Billboard Hot 100 release, where it went to #99. "I Believe" was also the group's second number on the US Billboard dance chart, where it spent one week at the top. It samples Ohio Players 1971 recording, "Pain".

Charts

Weekly charts

Year-end charts

See also
 List of number-one dance singles of 1994 (U.S.)

References

1994 songs
1994 singles
Gospel songs
Songs written by Jimmy Jam and Terry Lewis
Song recordings produced by Jimmy Jam and Terry Lewis
Music Week number-one dance singles